Here and Now and Sounding Good!, released in 1966, was the sixth Dick Morrissey Quartet recording. The tracks included were a tribute to Dick Morrissey's friends and fellow British jazz musicians.

It was re-released as a CD in 2007.

Track listing 

 "Off the Wagon" (Tubby Hayes) 
 "Corpus" (Ian Hamer) 
 "Don't Fall Over the Bridge" (Tubby Hayes)
 "Sunday Lunch" (Dick Morrissey)
 "Little Miss Sadly" (Stan Tracey) 
 "El Schtuck" (Harry South)

Personnel 

Dick Morrissey - tenor sax
Harry South - piano 
Phil Bates - double bass
Bill Eyden - drums

See also 
Dick Morrissey discography

References

1966 albums
Dick Morrissey albums
Mercury Records albums